The Swiss Mathematical Society, founded in Basel on September 4, 1910, is the national mathematical society of Switzerland and a member society of the European Mathematical Society. It is notably running the scholarly journal Commentarii Mathematici Helvetici (founded by the Society in 1929) and Elemente der Mathematik (founded in 1946), both currently published by the European Mathematical Society.

Presidents 
1910–12 Rudolf Fueter
1913–15 Henri Fehr
1916–17 Marcel Grossmann (ETH Zurich)
1918–19 Michel Plancherel
1920–21 Louis Crelier
1922–23 Gustave Dumas (University of Lausanne)
1924–25 Andreas Speiser
1926–27 Ferdinand Gonseth (Bern)
1928–29 Severin Bays (Fribourg)
1930–31  Samuel Dumas (Bern)
1932–33 Gustave Juvet (University of Lausanne)
1934–35 Walter Saxer (ETH Zurich)
1936–37 Rolin Wavre
1938–39 Willy Scherrer (Bern)
1940–41 Louis Kollros (ETH Zurich)
1942–43 Paul Buchner (Basel)
1944–45 Georges de Rham
1946–47 Max Gut (Universität Zurich)
1948–49 Charles Blanc (University of Lausanne)
1950–51 Albert Pfluger
1952–53 Félix Fiala (Neuchâtel)
1954–55 Johann Jakob Burckhardt
1956–57 Eduard Stiefel (ETH Zurich)
1958–59 Georges Vincent (University of Lausanne)
1960–61 Heinrich Jecklin (University of Zurich)
1962–63 Beno Eckmann (ETH Zurich)
1964–65 Jean de Siebenthal (EPF Lausanne)
1966–67 Heinz Huber (Basel)
1968–69 Walter Nef (Bern)
1970–71 Roger Bader (Neuchâtel)
1972–73 Ernst Specker (ETH Zurich)
1974–75 André Haefliger (Geneva)
1976–77 Heinrich Kleisli (Fribourg)
1978–79 André Delessert (University of Lausanne)
1980–81 Pierre Gabriel (Peter Gabriel)
1982–83 Alain Robert (Neuchâtel)
1984–85 Henri Carnal (Bern)
1986–87 Shristi D. Chatterji (EPF Lausanne)
1988–89 Norbert A’Campo (Basel)
1990–91 Urs Stammbach (ETH Zurich)
1992–93 Harald Holmann (Fribourg)
1994–95 François Sigrist (Neuchâtel)
1996–97 Hans Jarchow (University of Zurich)
1998–99 Gerhard Wanner (Geneva)
2000–01 Urs Würgler (Bern)
2002–03 Rolf Jeltsch (ETH Zurich)
2004–05 Peter Buser (EPF Lausanne)
2006–07 Norbert Hungerbühler (Fribourg)
2008–09 Viktor Schroeder (University of Zurich)
2010–11 Bruno Colbois (Neuchâtel)
2012–13 Christine Riedtmann (University of Bern)
2014–15 Nicolas Monod (EPF Lausanne)
2016–17 Anand Dessai (University of Fribourg)
2018–19 Urs Lang (ETH Zurich)
2020–21 Jeremy Blanc (Basel)

External links
Official website
Information at the University of St Andrews

Mathematical societies
Scientific organisations based in Switzerland
Organizations established in 1910
1910 establishments in Switzerland